Zucco may refer to:

People
Francesco Zucco (1570–1627), Italian painter
George Zucco (1886–1960), English character actor
Ross Zucco (1934–1960), American speed skater
Vic Zucco (born 1935), American football defensive back

Art and literature
Tony Zucco, character in the DC Comics universe
Roberto Zucco, a play about Roberto Succo

Places
Monte Zucco, mountain In Italy

See also
Zuco 103, a Dutch musical ensemble
Zuko (name), people with the name Zuko
Zuko, a fictional character in Avatar: The Last Airbender
Zuccone (disambiguation)
Zucconi (disambiguation)
Zucchini (disambiguation)